Sir Edwin Landseer Lutyens  (29 March 1869 – 1 January 1944) was an English architect known for imaginatively adapting traditional architectural styles to the requirements of his era. He designed many English country houses, war memorials and public buildings. In his biography, the writer Christopher Hussey wrote, "In his lifetime (Lutyens) was widely held to be our greatest architect since Wren if not, as many maintained, his superior". The architectural historian Gavin Stamp described him as "surely the greatest British architect of the twentieth (or of any other) century".

Lutyens played an instrumental role in designing and building New Delhi, which would later on serve as the seat of the Government of India. In recognition of his contribution, New Delhi is also known as "Lutyens' Delhi". In collaboration with Sir Herbert Baker, he was also the main architect of several monuments in New Delhi such as the India Gate; he also designed Viceroy's House, which is now known as the Rashtrapati Bhavan.
Many of his works were inspired by Indian architecture. He was elected Master of the Art Workers' Guild in 1933.

Early life 
Lutyens was born in Kensington, London, the tenth of thirteen children of Mary Theresa Gallwey (1832/33–1906) from Killarney, Ireland, and Captain Charles Augustus Henry Lutyens (1829–1915), a soldier and painter. His sister, Mary Constance Elphinstone Lutyens (1868–1951), wrote novels under her married name of Mrs George Wemyss. He grew up in Thursley, Surrey. He was named after a friend of his father, the painter and sculptor Edwin Henry Landseer. Lutyens studied architecture at South Kensington School of Art, London, from 1885 to 1887. After college he joined the Ernest George and Harold Peto architectural practice. It was here that he first met Sir Herbert Baker. For many years he worked from offices at 29 Bloomsbury Square, London.

Architectural career

Private practice

He began his own practice in 1888, his first commission being a private house at Crooksbury, Farnham, Surrey. During this work, he met the garden designer and horticulturalist Gertrude Jekyll. In 1896 he began work on a house for Jekyll at Munstead Wood near Godalming, Surrey. It was the beginning of a professional partnership that would define the look of many Lutyens country houses.

The "Lutyens-Jekyll" garden had hardy shrubbery and herbaceous plantings within a structural architecture of stairs and balustraded terraces. This combined style, of the formal with the informal, exemplified by brick paths, herbaceous borders, and with plants such as lilies, lupins, delphiniums and lavender, was in contrast to the formal bedding schemes favoured by the previous generation in the 19th century. This "natural" style was to define the "English garden" until modern times.

Lutyens' fame grew largely through the popularity of the new lifestyle magazine Country Life created by Edward Hudson, which featured many of his house designs. Hudson was a great admirer of Lutyens' style and commissioned Lutyens for a number of projects, including Lindisfarne Castle and the Country Life headquarters building in London, at 8 Tavistock Street. One of his assistants in the 1890s was Maxwell Ayrton.

By the turn of the century, Lutyens was recognised as one of architecture's coming men. In his major study of English domestic buildings, Das englische Haus, published in 1904, Hermann Muthesius wrote of Lutyens, "He is a young man who has come increasingly to the forefront of domestic architects and who may soon become the accepted leader among English builders of houses".

Works 

The bulk of Lutyens' early work consisted of private houses in an Arts and Crafts style, strongly influenced by Tudor architecture and the vernacular styles of south-east England. This was the most innovative phase of his career. Important works of this period include Munstead Wood, Tigbourne Court, Orchards and Goddards in Surrey, Deanery Garden and Folly Farm in Berkshire, Overstrand Hall in Norfolk and Le Bois des Moutiers in France.

After about 1900 this style gave way to a more conventional Classicism, a change of direction which had a profound influence on wider British architectural practice. His commissions were of a varied nature from private houses to two churches for the new Hampstead Garden Suburb in London to Julius Drewe's Castle Drogo near Drewsteignton in Devon and on to his contributions to India's new imperial capital, New Delhi (where he worked as chief architect with Herbert Baker and others). Here he added elements of local architectural styles to his classicism, and based his urbanisation scheme on Mughal water gardens. He also designed the Hyderabad House for the last Nizam of Hyderabad, as his Delhi palace and planned the layout for the Janpath and Rajpath roads.

Before the end of the First World War, he was appointed one of three principal architects for the Imperial War Graves Commission (now Commonwealth War Graves Commission) and was involved with the creation of many monuments to commemorate the dead. Larger cemeteries have a Stone of Remembrance, designed by him. The best known of these monuments are the Cenotaph in Whitehall, Westminster, and the Memorial to the Missing of the Somme, Thiepval. The Cenotaph was originally commissioned by David Lloyd George as a temporary structure to be the centrepiece of the Allied Victory Parade in 1919. Lloyd George proposed a catafalque, a low empty platform, but it was Lutyens' idea for the taller monument. The design took less than six hours to complete. Lutyens also designed many other war memorials, and others are based on or inspired by Lutyens' designs. Examples of Lutyens' other war memorials include the War Memorial Gardens in Dublin, the Tower Hill memorial, the Manchester Cenotaph and the Arch of Remembrance memorial in Leicester.

Lutyens also refurbished Lindisfarne Castle for its wealthy owner.

One of Lutyens' smaller works, but considered one of his masterpieces, is The Salutation, a house in Sandwich, Kent, England. Built in 1911–1912 with a  garden, it was commissioned by Henry Farrer, one of three sons of Sir William Farrer.

He was knighted in 1918 and elected a Royal Academician in March 1920. In 1924, he was appointed a member of the newly created Royal Fine Art Commission, a position he held until his death.

While work continued in New Delhi, Lutyens received other commissions including several commercial buildings in London and the British Embassy in Washington, DC.

In 1924 he completed the supervision of the construction of what is perhaps his most popular design: Queen Mary's Dolls' House. This four-storey Palladian villa was built in 1/12 scale and is now a permanent exhibit in the public area of Windsor Castle. It was not conceived or built as a plaything for children; its goal was to exhibit the finest British craftsmanship of the period.

Lutyens was commissioned in 1929 to design a new Roman Catholic cathedral in Liverpool. He planned a vast building of brick and granite, topped with towers and a  dome, with commissioned sculpture work by Charles Sargeant Jagger and W. C. H. King. Work on this  building started in 1933, but was halted during World War II. After the war, the project ended due to a shortage of funding, with only the crypt completed. A model of Lutyens' unrealised building was given to and restored by the Walker Art Gallery in 1975 and is now on display in the Museum of Liverpool. The architect of the present Liverpool Metropolitan Cathedral, which was built over part of the crypt and consecrated in 1967, was Sir Frederick Gibberd.

In 1945, a year after his death, A Plan for the City & County of Kingston upon Hull was published. Lutyens worked on the plan with Sir Patrick Abercrombie and they are credited as its co-authors. Abercrombie's introduction in the plan makes special reference to Lutyens' contribution. The plan was, however, rejected by the City Council of Hull. He was also involved in the Royal Academy's planning for post-war London, an endeavour dismissed by Osbert Lancaster as "... not unlike what the new Nuremberg might have been had the Fuhrer enjoyed the inestimable advantage of the advice and guidance of the late Sir Aston Webb".

Overseas commissions

Ireland (1906–1918)
Works in Ireland include the Irish National War Memorial Gardens in Islandbridge in Dublin, which consists of a bridge over the railway and a bridge over the River Liffey (unbuilt) and two tiered sunken gardens; Heywood House Gardens, County Laois (open to the public), consisting of a hedge garden, lawns, tiered sunken garden and a belvedere; extensive changes and extensions to Lambay Castle, Lambay Island, near Dublin, consisting of a circular battlement enclosing the restored and extended castle and farm building complex, upgraded cottages and stores near the harbour, a real tennis court, a large guest house (The White House), a boathouse and a chapel; alterations and extensions to Howth Castle, County Dublin; the unbuilt Hugh Lane gallery straddling the River Liffey on the site of the Ha'penny Bridge and the unbuilt Hugh Lane Gallery on the west side of St Stephen's Green; and Costelloe Lodge at Casla (also known as Costelloe), County Galway (that was used for refuge by J. Bruce Ismay, the Chairman of the White Star Line, following the sinking of the R.M.S. Titanic). In 1907, Lutyens designed Tranarossan House, located just north of Downings on the Rosguill Peninsula on the north coast of County Donegal. The house was built of local granite for Mr and Mrs Phillimore, from London, as a holiday home. In 1937, Mrs Phillimore donated it to An Óige (Irish Youth Hostels Association) for the "youth of Ireland", and it has been a hostel ever since.

India (1912–1930) 

Largely designed by Lutyens over 20 or so years (1912 to 1930), New Delhi, situated within the metropolis of Delhi, popularly known as 'Lutyens' Delhi', was chosen to replace Calcutta as the seat of the British Indian government in 1912; the project was completed in 1929 and officially inaugurated in 1931. In undertaking this project, Lutyens invented his own new order of classical architecture, which has become known as the Delhi Order and was used by him for several designs in England, such as Campion Hall, Oxford. Unlike the more traditional British architects who came before him, he was both inspired by and incorporated various features from the local and traditional Indian architecture—something most clearly seen in the great drum-mounted Buddhist dome of Viceroy's House, now Rashtrapati Bhavan. The building was designed as the official residence of the Viceroy of India and is now the official residence of the President of India.

The Delhi Order columns at the front entrance of the palace have bells carved into them, which, it has been suggested, Lutyens had designed with the idea that as the bells were silent the British rule would never come to an end. At one time, more than 2,000 people were required to care for the building and serve the Viceroy's household.

The new city contains both the Parliament buildings and government offices (many designed by Herbert Baker) and was built distinctively of the local red sandstone using the traditional Mughal style.

When composing the plans for New Delhi, Lutyens planned for the new city to lie southwest of the walled city of Shahjahanbad. His plans for the city also laid out the street plan for New Delhi consisting of wide tree-lined avenues.

Built in the spirit of British colonial rule, the place where the new imperial city and the older native settlement met was intended to be a market. It was there that Lutyens imagined the Indian traders would participate in "the grand shopping centre for the residents of Shahjahanabad and New Delhi", thus giving rise to the D-shaped market seen today.

Many of the garden-ringed villas in the Lutyens' Bungalow Zone (LBZ)—also known as Lutyens' Delhi—that were part of Lutyens' original scheme for New Delhi are under threat due to the constant pressure for development in Delhi. The LBZ was placed on the 2002 World Monuments Fund Watch List of 100 Most Endangered Sites. None of the bungalows in the LBZ were designed by Lutyens—he only designed the four bungalows in the Presidential Estate surrounding Rashtrapati Bhavan at Willingdon Crescent, now known as Mother Teresa Crescent. Other buildings in Delhi that Lutyens designed include Baroda House, Bikaner House, Hyderabad House, and Patiala House.

In recognition of his architectural accomplishments for the British Raj, Lutyens was made a Knight Commander of the Order of the Indian Empire (KCIE) on 1 January 1930. As a chivalric order, the KCIE knighthood held precedence over his earlier bachelor knighthood.

A bust of Lutyens in the former Viceroy's House is the only statue of a Westerner left in its original position in New Delhi. Lutyens' work in New Delhi is the focus of Robert Grant Irving's book Indian Summer. In spite of his monumental work in India, Lutyens views on the peoples of the Indian sub-continent, although not uncommon for people of his time, would now be considered racist.

Spain (1915–1928)
In Madrid, Lutyens' work can be seen in the interiors of the Liria Palace, a neoclassical building which was severely damaged during the Spanish Civil War. The palace was originally built in the 18th century for James FitzJames, 1st Duke of Berwick, and still belongs to his descendants. Lutyens' reconstruction was commissioned by Jacobo Fitz-James Stuart, 17th Duke of Alba. The Duke had been in contact with Lutyens while serving as the Spanish ambassador to the Court of St. James's.

Between 1915 and 1928, Lutyens also produced designs for a new palace for the Duke of Alba's younger brother, Hernando Fitz-James Stuart, 18th Duke of Peñaranda. The palace of El Guadalperal, as it was to be called, would have been, if built, Edwin Lutyens's largest country house.

Personal life 
Lutyens married Lady Emily Bulwer-Lytton (1874–1964) on 4 August 1897 at Knebworth, Hertfordshire. She was third daughter of Edith (née Villiers) and the 1st Earl of Lytton, a former Viceroy of India. Lady Emily had proposed to Lutyens two years before the wedding, and her parents disapproved of the marriage. Their marriage was largely unsatisfactory, practically from the start, with Lady Emily developing interests in theosophy, Eastern religions, and being drawn both emotionally and philosophically to Jiddu Krishnamurti. They had five children:

 Barbara Lutyens (1898–1981), second wife of Euan Wallace (1892–1941), Minister of Transport.
 Robert Lutyens (1901–1971), interior designer. Designed the façade used for over 40 Marks & Spencer stores.
 Ursula Lutyens (1904–1967), wife of the 3rd Viscount Ridley. They were the parents of the 4th Viscount Ridley (1925–2012), and of the Cabinet Minister Nicholas Ridley (1929–1993). Nicholas Ridley was the father of Edwin Lutyens' biographer, Jane Ridley.
 (Agnes) Elisabeth Lutyens (1906–1983), a well-known composer. Second marriage to the conductor Edward Clark.
 (Edith Penelope) Mary Lutyens (1908–1999), a writer known for her books about the philosopher Jiddu Krishnamurti.

During the later years of his life, Lutyens suffered with several bouts of pneumonia.

Death
In the early 1940s he was diagnosed with cancer. He died on 1 January 1944 and was cremated at Golders Green Crematorium in north London where he had designed the Philipson Mausoleum in 1914–1916. His ashes were buried in the crypt of St. Paul's Cathedral, beneath a memorial designed by his friend and fellow architect William Curtis Green.

Major buildings and projects 

 1897: Munstead Wood, Surrey
 1899: Orchards, Surrey
 1900: Goddards, Surrey
 1901: Tigbourne Court, Surrey
 1901: Deanery Garden, Sonning, Berkshire
 1903: Papillon Hall, Lubenham, Leicestershire
 1911: British Medical Association in Tavistock Square, London
 1912: Great Dixter, Northiam, East Sussex
 1928: Hyderabad House, New Delhi
 1929: Rashtrapathi Bhavan, New Delhi
 1930: Castle Drogo, Drewsteignton, Devon
 1935: The Midland Bank, Manchester
 1936: Baroda House, New Delhi
 1936—1938: Villers–Bretonneux Australian National Memorial, Somme, France

Recognition and legacy 

Lutyens received the RIBA Royal Gold Medal in 1921, and the American Institute of Architects Gold Medal in 1925. In November 2015 the British government announced that all 44 of Lutyens' First World War memorials in Britain had now been listed on the advice of Historic England, and were therefore all protected by law. This involved the one remaining memorial—the Gerrards Cross Memorial Building in Buckinghamshire—being added to the list, plus a further fourteen having their statuses upgraded.

The architectural critic Ian Nairn wrote of Lutyen's Surrey "masterpieces" in the 1971 Surrey volume of the Buildings of England series, while noting that; "the genius and the charlatan were very close together in Lutyens". In the introduction to the catalogue for the 1981 Lutyens exhibition at the Hayward Gallery, the architectural writer Colin Amery described Lutyens as "the builder of some of our finest country houses and gardens".

In 2015 a memorial to Lutyens by the sculptor Stephen Cox was erected in Apple Tree Yard, Mayfair, London, adjacent to the studio where Lutyens prepared the designs for New Delhi.

Gallery

Publications 
 Edwin Lutyens & Charles Bressey, The Highway Development Survey, Ministry of Transport, 1937
 Edwin Lutyens & Patrick Abercrombie, A Plan for the City & County of Kingston upon Hull, Brown (London & Hull), 1945.

See also 

 Herbert Tudor Buckland, a contemporary Arts & Crafts architect
 Butterfly plan
 History of gardening
 Landscape design history (category)

Footnotes

References

Sources

Further reading

External links 

 The Lutyens Trust
 Jane Ridley, "Architect for the metropolis", City Journal, Spring 1998
 The creations of Sir Edwin Lutyens @ Ward's Book of Days
 The cathedral that never was – exhibition of Lutyens' cathedral model at the Walker Art Gallery
  – An 1898 house in France designed by Lutyens and its garden designed by Lutyens and Gertrude Jekyll.
 Collection of over 2000 photos of Lutyens' work on Flickr

1869 births
1944 deaths
Artists from London
People of the Victorian era
Architects from London
British neoclassical architects
Arts and Crafts movement artists
Arts and Crafts architects
Fellows of the Royal Institute of British Architects
19th-century English architects
20th-century English architects
Royal Academicians
Members of the Order of Merit
Knights Commander of the Order of the Indian Empire
Knights Bachelor
Alumni of the Royal College of Art
Recipients of the Royal Gold Medal
Commonwealth War Graves Commission
Golders Green Crematorium
Burials at St Paul's Cathedral
Lutyens family
Masters of the Art Worker's Guild
Recipients of the AIA Gold Medal